Miss Venezuela 1981 was the 28th Miss Venezuela pageant, was held in Caraballeda, Vargas state, Venezuela, on May 7, 1981, after weeks of events.  The winner of the pageant was Irene Sáez, Miss Miranda.

The pageant was broadcast live on Venevision from the Macuto Sheraton Hotel in Caraballeda, Vargas state. At the conclusion of the final night of competition, outgoing titleholder Maye Brandt, crowned Irene Sáez of Miranda as the new Miss Venezuela.

Sáez, and Pilin León, that year's first runner-up, would later go on to become Miss Universe 1981 and Miss World 1981, respectively, marking the first time ever for Venezuela to win both major international beauty pageants in the same year.

Results

Special awards
 Miss Photogenic (voted by press reporters) - Irene Sáez (Miss Miranda)
 Miss Congeniality - Maricel Aizpúrua (Miss Amazonas)
 Miss Elegance - Miúrica Yánez (Miss Bolívar)
 Miss Amity - Miúrica Yánez (Miss Bolívar)

Delegates
The Miss Venezuela 1981 delegates are:

 Miss Amazonas - Maricel Aizpúrua Laguna
 Miss Apure - Norys Cristina Silva Correa
 Miss Aragua - Carmen Josefina (Pilin) León Crespo
 Miss Barinas - Mariela Pérez Rodríguez
 Miss Bolívar - Miúrica Yánez Callender
 Miss Carabobo - Diana Mercedes Iturriza Rondón
 Miss Departamento Vargas - Irama Muñoz Silva
 Miss Distrito Federal - Miriam Sagrario Quintana Quintana
 Miss Falcón - Leonor Fernández Páez
 Miss Guárico - Rosana Mangieri Carmeniu
 Miss Lara - Ursula Elena Remien Schuchard
 Miss Mérida - Marle Yajaira Broccolo Castro
 Miss Miranda - Irene Lailín Sáez Conde
 Miss Monagas - Yesenia Maurera
 Miss Portuguesa - Olga Martínez
 Miss Sucre - Zulay Lorenzo
 Miss Táchira - Dulce Leonor Porras
 Miss Trujillo - Hodalys Pavía
 Miss Zulia - Ana Verónica Muñoz Blum

External links
Miss Venezuela official website

1981 beauty pageants
1981 in Venezuela